Grégoire Illorson (born 6 January 1955) is a Cameroonian sprinter. He competed in the men's 100 metres at the 1980 Summer Olympics.

References

1955 births
Living people
Athletes (track and field) at the 1980 Summer Olympics
Cameroonian male sprinters
Olympic athletes of Cameroon
Place of birth missing (living people)